The women's  100 metre freestyle event at the 1982 World Aquatics Championships took place 1 August.

Results

Heats

Finals

Final B

Final A

References

USASwimming

Swimming at the 1982 World Aquatics Championships